Pediasia kuldjaensis is a species of moth in the family Crambidae described by Aristide Caradja in 1916. It is found in Russia, China and Turkmenistan.

References

Moths described in 1916
Crambini
Moths of Europe
Moths of Asia